Neoptychodes is a genus of flat-faced longhorn beetles in the subfamily Lamiinae.

Species
 Neoptychodes candidus (Bates, 1885)
 Neoptychodes cosmeticus Martins & Galileo, 1996
 Neoptychodes cretatus (Bates, 1872)
 Neoptychodes hondurae (White, 1858)
 Neoptychodes trilineatus (Linnaeus, 1771)

References

Lamiini